Giulia Andreani, born in Venice in 1985, is an Italian artist who lives and works in Paris. She is represented by Galerie Max Hetzler.

Education 
Andreani graduated from the Academy of Fine Arts in Venice in 2008. She continued her studies in the history of art,  graduating with a master's degree in contemporary art from Paris IV-Sorbonne University in 2010.

Works 
Andreani focuses on the pictorial genre of history painting. She collects images from libraries, archives and family albums which she transposes into her works and painting using only the colour Payne's grey.

In 2012, she took inspiration from Italian cinema to trace the history of Europe between the 1920s and 1960s. She directed a series of dictators, for which she chose photographs representing teenagers. In the series entitled Daddies, Hitler's generals are presented as good fathers. 

In 2013, she painted the portrait of Margaret Thatcher looking uncomfortable whilst holding newborns in her arms.

In 2015, she worked on the representation of women serving male power during the First World War, portraying women at work in men's clothes in roles such as  firefighters or railway workers.

In 2018, she presented L'intermezzo (The Interlude), a project from a 2017 residency in a maternal center in the suburbs of Paris. She combined images of Cuban soldiers from the 2000s with portraits of young mothers. The title of the project was a reference to Les Guérillères, a feminist novel by Monique Wittig published in 1969.

In 2022, she had a solo exhibition entitled 'Kitchen Knife' at Galerie Max Hetzler Bleibtreustraße 45 location. 

Andreani was nominated for the Prix Marcel Duchamp 2022.

Awards 

 2022: Prix Marcel Duchamp 2022 (Nomination)
 2013 : Aica Award
 2012 : Sciences Po Prize for Contemporary Art
 2011 : Paliss'art

Public Collections  

Bibliothèque Nationale de France (BNF), Paris

Centre culturel régional Opderschmelz, Dudelange

Collection de la Ville de Montrouge, Mountrouge 

Centre Georges Pompidou, Paris

Fondazione Sandretto Re Rebaudengo, Turin

FRAC Poitou-Charentes, Angoulême

MASP, São Paulo

Musée National de l'Histoire de l'Immigration (MNHI), Paris

URDLA, Villeurbanne

Solo Exhibitions 

 Kitchen Knife, Galerie Max Hetzler, Berlin (2022)
 Pétrichor, Galerie Saint-Séverin, Paris (2020)
 Pigs and Old Lace, Galerie Max Hetzler, London (2020)
 La cattiva, Musée des Beaux-Arts de Dole, Dole (2019)
 Art Must Hang, Galerie Max Hetzler, Paris (2019)
 Correspondances, Villa Médicis, Rome (2018)
 Intermezzo, VNH Gallery, Paris (2018)
 Silent faces, 22.48 m2, Paris (2014)
 Giulia Andreani & Agathe Pitié, Galerie de l'Escale, Levallois (2013)
 [non] si passa la frontiera, Bendana-Pinel Art Contemporain, Paris (2013)
 Peintures et dessins, Hôtel du département de l’Eure, Évreux (2012)
 Journal d’une iconophage, Galerie Premier Regard, Paris (2012)
 I shot him down, L’inlassable Galerie, Paris (2012)

Group Exhibitions 

Prix Marcel Duchamp 2022, Centre Pompidou, Paris (2022)
Manifesto of Fragility: The 16th Lyon Biennale, Lyon (2022)
Avec un parfum d'aventure (With a Hint of Adventure), Musée d'Art Contemporain, Lyon (2020)
 Made in France, Galerie Max Hetzler, Paris (2020)

References

External links 
Galerie Max Hetzler, Giulia Andreani

1985 births
Living people
20th-century Italian women artists
Artists from Venice
Italian contemporary artists
Modern painters
Italian expatriates in France